Tom Zirbel (born October 30, 1978) is an American former road bicycle racing cyclist, who rode professionally between 2006 and 2016 for the ,  and  teams.

Career
He came fourth in the UCI Road World Championships time trial in September 2009, and had signed to join UCI ProTour team  the following season.

In December 2009, a urine test taken at the United States National Time Trial Championships the previous August, in which Zirbel came second, tested positive for dehydroepiandrosterone (DHEA). Zirbel denied having taken the substance knowingly, but he nevertheless voluntarily accepted a two-year suspension, and immediately announced his retirement. His suspension was reduced in March 2011 to 18 months, which had already been served, in recognition of assistance given to the United States Anti-Doping Agency (USADA). He suggested that, despite earlier comments about retiring, he would seek to resume his racing career. He maintains that he ingested the banned product inadvertently.

On May 28, 2011, he placed 2nd in the United States National Time Trial Championships, behind David Zabriskie. He joined  for the 2012 season. In an interview with cyclingnews.com in early 2016, Zirbel confirmed that the upcoming season would be his last as a professional cyclist before retiring. In September of that year, he set a new American national hour record in Aguascalientes, Mexico, completing  to break the 1997 record of  set by Norman Alvis.

Major results

2007
 Tour of Southland
1st Stages 1 (ITT) & 9
 10th Tour de Leelanau
2008
 1st Stage 3 Tour of the Gila
 1st Stage 5 Tour of Utah
 2nd Time trial, National Road Championships
 3rd Overall Tour of Elk Grove
1st Prologue
 8th Overall Cascade Cycling Classic
2009
 2nd Time trial, National Road Championships
 2nd Overall Redlands Bicycle Classic
 2nd Overall Nature Valley Grand Prix
1st Stage 1 (ITT)
 4th Time trial, UCI Road World Championships
 4th Overall Tour of Missouri
2011
 2nd Time trial, National Road Championships
 3rd Univest Grand Prix
2012
 2nd Overall Vuelta del Uruguay
 5th Chrono Champenois
 6th Overall Tour of Elk Grove
1st Stage 1 (ITT)
 7th Duo Normand (with Scott Zwizanski)
2013
 1st  Time trial, National Road Championships
 1st Stage 4 Volta ao Alentejo
 9th Overall Tour of the Gila
1st Stage 3 (ITT)
2014
 2nd Time trial, National Road Championships
2015
 1st Stage 3 (ITT) Tour of the Gila
2016
 1st Stage 3 (ITT) Tour of the Gila
 2nd Time trial, National Road Championships

References

External links
 Team Profile

American male cyclists
1978 births
Living people
People from Clear Lake, Iowa